Sergio Casal and Emilio Sánchez were the defending champions but lost in the second round to Marcelo Filippini and Horst Skoff.

Tomáš Šmíd and Mark Woodforde won in the final 1–6, 6–4, 6–2 against Paolo Canè and Diego Nargiso.

Seeds
All eight seeded teams received byes to the second round.

Draw

Finals

Top half

Bottom half

External links
 1989 Monte Carlo Open Doubles Draw

1989 Monte Carlo Open